Israel–Norway relations are the bilateral relations between Israel and Norway. Norway was one of the first countries to recognize Israel, doing so on 4 February 1949.

History
On 11 May 1949, Norway was one of the U.N. members that voted in the General Assembly to admit Israel to the UN. Both countries established diplomatic relations later that year. 

Israel has an embassy in Oslo, which serves Norway and Iceland. Norway has an embassy in Tel Aviv and two honorary consulates, one in Eilat and the other in Haifa.

In 1981, a group of labour union members founded the organization Friends of Israel in the Norwegian Labour Movement (Norwegian: Venner av Israel i Norsk Arbeiderbevegelse). The purpose was to strengthen relations between Norwegian and Israeli labor movement in an informal and personal way. This was done by sending delegations to Israel, and by receiving visitors from Israel. Israel's ambassador to Oslo was an Israeli Druze poet and university lecturer, Naim Araidi. His deputy was George Deek, a Christian Arab from Jaffa.

Norway provided the facilities in 1993 to Israel and the Palestinian Liberation Organisation (PLO) that culminated in the Oslo Accords. In March 2007, the Norwegian government recognized the Hamas-led 2007 Palestinian unity government, and restoring full political and economic ties, but calling on the Palestinian authorities to renounce violence and recognize Israel's right to exist. The unity government failed to get international support because it did not meet the conditions set by the Quartet. Israel said it would not deal with the new Palestinian government unless it recognised Israel, which it refused to do.

The leader of the third largest political party in Norway, Siv Jensen  a supporter of Israel, said she was not afraid to defend Israel's right to defend itself. She visited the Israeli city of Sderot in the summer of 2008 and experienced the landing of a rocket from Hamas first hand. She and others had to run for the air-raid shelter. She opposed the Norwegian government's decision to recognise Hamas because "you don't negotiate with terrorists, you just don't."

In January 2009, she appeared at a pro-Israel demonstration in Oslo. The Norwegian Police Security Service feared that Jensen might be the target of an attack although Jensen herself was not concerned. While political scientists had speculated that the Progress Party would lose more voters than they would gain by this support for Israel, polls showed a slight increase in support for the party.

In 2010, the Norwegian Foreign Ministry said "Norway considers the Israeli presence in East Jerusalem to be in violation of international law, as does the entire international community."
George Deek became chargé d'affaires at the embassy until the new ambassador Rafael Schultz started his mission in the summer of 2014.

Military ties
In 2007, 24 Norwegian Jews were registered as working for the Israeli military.

In September 2010, after Germany began testing two new Dolphin class submarines for the Israeli Navy, Norway banned them from testing in its territorial waters, due to their possible future role in enforcing the Blockade of the Gaza Strip.

See also 
 Israels Venner på Stortinget (Friends of Israel in the Parliament of Norway)
 International recognition of Israel
 History of the Jews in Norway
 2009 Oslo riots
 Lillehammer affair

References

Further reading
Paul Engstad Norsk arbeiderbevegelses samarbeid med Israel og innsats for fred i Midtøsten : Israel 50 år 1948-1998. VINA Oslo 1998.

External links 
  Norwegian Ministry of Foreign Affairs: information about the relation with Norway
  Norwegian embassy in Tel Aviv
 MIFF - Med Israel For Fred
 Norge IDAG
 DagenMagazinet

 

 
Norway
Bilateral relations of Norway